Thomas Boy Guest was an Ontario political figure. He represented Perth South in the Legislative Assembly of Ontario from 1871 to 1874. He was born in Ireland in 1816.

He served as reeve of St. Mary's in 1855 to 1856, warden for Perth County in 1856 and mayor of St. Mary's in 1864. He was also lieutenant-colonel of the local militia. He died at St. Mary's in 1884 and was buried at the St. Mary's Protestant Cemetery.

References

External links 

History of Perth County to 1967, Johnston (1967)

1816 births
1884 deaths
Progressive Conservative Party of Ontario MPPs
Mayors of places in Ontario